Bhadrak is a district of Odisha state in eastern India. Bhadrak city is the headquarters and the largest city of the district.

Origin of name
The district is named after goddess Bhadrakali whose temple is situated in Agarpada which is 8 km distant from the Bhadrak city.

History
The district includes Rakta Tirtha Eram in Basudevpur, where about 30 people along with a woman named Pari Bewa were killed by the British police, DSP Kunjabihari Mohanty while fighting for independence. The legendary history of Bhadrak District dates back to the age of the Puranas when Odisha achieved thriving maritime and agrarian prosperity. As far as the history is concerned, king Mukunda Dev was the last sovereign indigenous ruler of Bhadrak. After the year 1575 following the discomfiture of the Afghans at the hand of Raja Man Singh under the Mughal period Bhadrak District survived as a Subha and later passed under the Nawabs of Bengal. When the Mughals diminished from the political scenario of Bhadrak District. In course of time Bhadrak District has passed on to the Marathas until the British occupied the entire region of Odisha.

Since independence, the history of Bhadrak has been the history of multifarious progress in Education, Industry, Agriculture, Trade and commerce and with the birth of a new star it is leaping towards the twenty-first century with hope and promise.

There are many historical places and monuments to visit in the Bhadrak District. Palia is famous for Biranchi Narayan Temple. Sri Radha Madanmohan temple is one of the most visited temples of Bhadrak District. Aradi situated at a distance of 10 km from Chandabali is famous for the temple of Akhandalamani. Chandabali is the first port to be established in odisha.

On 1 April 1993, this district was carved out from the Balasore District and became a separate entity.

Administrative Division
It consists of 1370 villages which constitute 7 Blocks. There are 4 urban bodies. They are Bhadrak and Basudevpur municipality and Chandabali and Dhamnagar NAC.

Geography

Salandi River passes by this district. Baitarani flows by Chandabali town and falls into the Bay of Bengal at Dhamara.

Economy
Agriculture is the main income of the district. But many people in the coastal area Dhamara of Chandabali Block to Padhuan of Basudevpur Block are depending upon the Fishing. Major fishing harbors are located at Dhamara, Kasia & Chudamani Some people in the Municipality area have sound small business.

Tourist places
Bhadrak has a special identity for ERAM VILLAGE which is known as "2ND JALIANAWALABAGH". It is 07 km from Basudevpur. A memorial was built for the martyrs of Eram massacre.
Akhandalamani Temple is on the bank of river Baitarani, the Akhandalamani Temple is the abode of Lord Shiva. The Patana Mangala ( Lankeswari ) in Chatrapada village is famous for Mangala temple with the biggest pond of Odisha. Chief interest of the place is its legendary history. As the history runs, king Niladri Samara Singha Mohapatra started worshipping the God Akhandalamani some 350 years ago, when the black glazed granite stone was found underground and the king dreamt of the god. However the religious and historical significance with which the place is invested, constitute it to be a center of special interest in the tourism of Bhadrak. Moreover, the artistic carvings of the temple deserve special worth to the tourist. Surrounding the temple many fairs and festivals are organized, the chief among which is the Mahashivaratri. During this festival, tourists, including a vast chunk of pilgrims, flock into the core of the temple.  On the month of Sravana, people from nationwide assemble here to pour the holy water on the Siva Linga and to offer their worship to Lord Shiva.  The Akhandalamani Temple is the principal source of the profitable development of the tourism industry of Bhadrak.
Dhamra Port is an ancient port on the banks of the river Baitarani, around 5 km from Kanika Palace.  The highlights are the direction tower and some ancient structures.
Jagannath Temple :- Nilok This is a sacred place of Hindus (Vaisava).
The BIRANCHINARAYAN Temple (Lord Brahmha) is one of the most ancient temple of Odisha in PALIA village that have a distance of 13 km from Bhadrak in Bhadrak-Chandbali route. Every year between January – February (In Odia Magha Masa from the date of Magha Purnima/Aghira purnima/Agni utshav Purnima) a Three day Mela is observed around the temple. This the best time to visit the temple for Picnic or for Puja.
Bhadrakali temple is one of the religious temple in the district from which the name "Bhadrak" is created.
It is well known for its famous kalipuja in the Bhadrak city.

Transport
Bhadrak railway station is the biggest railway station of Bhadrak district and serves Bhadrak city. An important upcoming town in Bhadrak district is Dhamara, which is upcoming newly built mega-port of the district. New railway line from Bhadrak to Dhamra is constructed.
Dhamra Airport is proposed to be built by the Dhamra Port Company Limited, 20 km from Dhamra Port

Also Chennai- Kolkata NH-16, State Highway 35,53 and 57 are passing through Bhadrak district.

Demographics

According to the 2011 census Bhadrak district has a population of 1,506,337, roughly equal to the nation of Gabon or the US state of Hawaii. This gives it a ranking of 332nd in India (out of a total of 640). Its population growth rate over the decade 2001–2011 was 12.95%. Bhadrak has a sex ratio of 981 females for every 1000 males, and a literacy rate of 83.25%. Scheduled Castes and Scheduled Tribes make up 22.23% and 2.02% of the population respectively.

At the time of the 2011 Census of India, 90.56% of the population in the district spoke Odia, 6.61% Urdu, 1.46% Bengali and 0.47% Santali as their first language.

Culture
Bhadrak is famous for Bhadrakali Temple, which is also now a great occasion over the district. 
Nalanga, a village in Gelpur Panchayat is famous for Lord Naleswar (Shiva). The Naleswar Temple is one of the oldest temples in Odisha. Nalanga is the birthplace of Lokakavi Jagannath Pani, the teacher of Baishnav Pani.
Kharida Binayakpur is another village in Basudevpur constituency of this district is famous for Maa Ankudeswari Temple and its Moha vishuba Sankranti, Ravan Podi during Durga puja also famous in this village.
Brahmangan, another village in Basudevpur constituency of this district is famous for its century-old Prasanna Khemeswar mahadeva temple and its melana jatra during holi. Durga puja & Jagar also famous in this village.
Biggest Pond in Odisha and Famous Maa Patana Mangala Temple (Chhatrapada) is about 38.0 km (43 min) away from Bhadrak. 
Banta, Basantia, Basudebpur blocks & villages respectively in which village various melas are organised in various days of the year out of which Panchuka Purnima which is celebrating in a very great fun of people in which boat is sailed in the big pond of Basantia village in the memories of Odia Sadhabas, who was going to make their business in the near islands like Java and Borneo, Indonesia for too many days.
Pirahat, the place in Tihidi block is historical and cultural area which is famous for durga puja, kali puja, and other festivals. Durga Puja of the village Barabatia completing 400 years shows the greatness of place. Many freedom fighters are also born in Pirahat. The Gandhi statue at Pirhat Kali Padia is the emblem of freedom fighters.

Notable people
 Laxmikanta Mohapatra (1888–1953), poet, writer, nationalist from Talapada, Tihidi
 Chakradhar Behera (1894–1973), leader of the Peasant Rebellion

Condition
Bhadrak district has been doing good in every consideration. A new palace type collectorate is constructed and being in service since 2016. The roads and environment is so clean to eyes. It has a large bus stand near Dakshinkali Temple and by NH-16.Every types of modern malls are there. It is the city of brotherhood between Hindu and Muslims. Both celebrate their ceremonies together with each other. In Puruna Bazaar there Budha Ganesh puja is celebrated by both Hindus and Muslims. It has Bhadrak autonomous college, which is soon going to be a university. New medical site is being started construction having 100 nursing training seats. It has been declared as the first nectar city of Odisha. It has Dhamara port which is so large and going to be the largest port in Asia. A polytechnic university is going to be started soon.

Politics

Vidhan sabha constituencies

The following is the 5 Vidhan sabha constituencies of Bhadrak district and the elected members of that area

Lok Sabha constituency
Bhadrak district belongs to Bhadrak constituency. Its member of parliament is Manjulata Mandal (BJD)

References

External links

 

 
1993 establishments in Orissa
Districts of Odisha